Rivers Cuomo (born June 13, 1970) is an American singer, songwriter, and musician. He is the lead vocalist, guitarist, pianist, songwriter, and frontman of the rock band Weezer.

Born in New York City, Cuomo was raised in a number of Buddhist communities in the Northeastern U.S. until the age of 10, when his family settled in Central Connecticut. He attended a number of public schools before moving to Los Angeles at age 18. Cuomo played in several bands in Connecticut and California before forming Weezer in 1992. Following the success of Weezer's self-titled debut album (informally referred to as The Blue Album) and the following tour, Cuomo spent time away from music. Convalescing after leg surgery, he enrolled at Harvard University, but dropped out to record Weezer's second album, Pinkerton (1996); he would later graduate from Harvard in 2006. Pinkerton was a commercial failure upon release, although the album would get universal retrospective praise in the years after and was certified platinum in 2016.

Due to the album's initial failure, Cuomo would start writing more pop-based material, evident in Weezer's third (and second self-titled) album (informally referred to as The Green Album), fifth album Make Believe, and seventh album Raditude. Weezer would receive a varying amount of critical and commercial success, and after the 4-year hiatus after the release of their eighth album Hurley in 2010, Weezer would have a commercial comeback with their ninth album Everything Will Be Alright in the End and tenth (and fourth self-titled) album (informally referred to as The White Album), which would return to their alternative rock sound and receive critical acclaim. The next three albums by Weezer, eleventh album Pacific Daydream, twelfth (and fifth self-titled) album (a covers album informally referred to as The Teal Album), and thirteenth (and sixth self-titled) album (informally referred to as The Black Album) would feature a more commercial pop sound. Weezer was working on a 1980s heavy metal-inspired album called Van Weezer, which was put on hold after the start of the COVID-19 pandemic in early 2020. Weezer would end up releasing the orchestra-based album OK Human in early 2021, with Van Weezer releasing on May of that year. Weezer's newest project, SZNZ, was a series of EPs based on the four seasons, Spring, Summer, Autumn, and Winter all released throughout 2022.

Cuomo has released several compilations of demos, including Alone: The Home Recordings of Rivers Cuomo (2007), Alone II: The Home Recordings of Rivers Cuomo (2008) and Alone III: The Pinkerton Years (2011), and an ungoing series of digital bundles available on his website's storefront, Weezify. He has collaborated with artists including Todd Rundgren and Panic! at the Disco; with Scott Murphy, he has released two Japanese-language albums under the name Scott & Rivers. 

Cuomo’s work with Weezer has had a considerable effect on the evolution of the emo and pop punk genres, with artists such as Fall Out Boy, Panic! At The Disco, Blink-182, My Chemical Romance, and Ozma citing Weezer as an influence. Weezer's material has received multiple awards and nominations, and The Blue Album and Pinkerton are now regarded by some as amongst the greatest albums of the 1990s.

Early life 
Rivers Cuomo was born on June 13, 1970, in New York City to a Frank Cuomo, of Italian descent, and Beverly Shoenberger, of German-English descent. Accounts differ as to the origin of his name. According to one account, Cuomo's mother named him Rivers either because he was born between the East and Hudson rivers in Manhattan or because she could hear a river outside her hospital window. However, his father, Frank Cuomo, a musician who played drums on the 1971 album Odyssey of Iska by jazz saxophonist Wayne Shorter, says Cuomo was named after three prominent soccer players: Rivellino, Luigi Riva, and Gianni Rivera, all of whom were playing in the 1970 World Cup.

Rivers was raised in Rochester, New York, at the Rochester Zen Center, until his father left the family in 1975. His mother relocated the family to Yogaville, an ashram in Yogaville, Virginia. Cuomo attended the Pomfret Community School, and his mother married Stephen Kitts. In 1980, Yogaville relocated to Virginia. The Kitts family opted to stay in Connecticut and moved to the Storrs/Mansfield area. During this time, Cuomo attended Mansfield Middle School and E.O. Smith High School. Rivers was a member of the high school choir and he performed in a school production of Grease as Johnny Casino. He also changed his name to Peter Kitts; after graduating, Cuomo reverted to his original name.

One of Cuomo's earliest music projects was the glam metal band Avant Garde. In 1989, after playing several shows in Connecticut, Avant Garde moved to Los Angeles and changed their name to Zoom, but broke up in 1990. During this time, Cuomo attended Santa Monica College. In 1990 and 1991, while Cuomo was writing material for what became Weezer's debut album, he was a roadie for the band King Size and worked at Tower Records, where he listened to "basically everything that was released at that time ... I was exposed to a ton of music I otherwise never would have heard."

Weezer 
Cuomo formed Weezer in 1992 with drummer Patrick Wilson, bassist Matt Sharp and guitarist Jason Cropper. "Weezer" was the nickname given to Cuomo by his father when he was a toddler. Weezer signed with DGC, a subsidiary of Geffen Records, on June 25, 1993, and released their self-titled debut album, commonly known as the Blue Album, in May 1994. Cropper was asked to leave the band by Cuomo during the album's recording, and was replaced by Brian Bell. The album was certified platinum on January 1, 1995, with sales of over one million. Despite his success, Cuomo tired of the monotony and loneliness of touring and developed a "huge inferiority complex" about rock music, saying: "I thought my songs were really simplistic and silly, and I wanted to write complex, intense, beautiful music."

In March 1995, Cuomo had extensive surgery to extend his left leg, which was 44mm shorter than the right. This involved the surgical breaking of the leg bone, followed by months of wearing a steel brace and painful physiotherapy sessions. The procedure affected his songwriting, as he would spend long periods hospitalized under the influence of painkillers.

In the fall of 1995, Cuomo enrolled in Harvard University to study classical composition. He told The New York Times: "The only time I could write songs was when my frozen dinner was in the microwave. The rest of the time I was doing homework." He auditioned for the Harvard-Radcliffe Collegium Musicum chorus, but was not selected. He became introverted and grew a beard, and wrote in his diaries how students wearing Weezer T-shirts did not recognize him.

Cuomo had planned Weezer's second album to be a rock opera, Songs from the Black Hole, but he abandoned the project as his songwriting became "darker, more visceral and exposed, less playful". Realizing he did not enjoy contemporary classical music, and missing Weezer, Cuomo dropped out of Harvard two semesters before graduation. He expressed the isolation and sexual frustration he had felt at Harvard in Weezer's second album, Pinkerton, released in September 1996. With a darker, more abrasive sound than Weezer's debut, Pinkerton was a commercial and critical failure, but attained critical acclaim later.

Following Pinkerton, Weezer went on a three-year hiatus. Cuomo enrolled at Harvard twice more and completed semesters in 1997 and 2004. During the 1997 semester, he played with a new band, Homie, in Boston. In February 1998, Cuomo disbanded Homie and moved to Los Angeles to work on new Weezer demos with Bell and Wilson, but the sessions were unproductive. In 1998 and 1999, he lived in an apartment under a freeway in Culver City, California. In an essay for Harvard, he wrote: "I became more and more isolated. I unplugged my phone. I painted the walls and ceiling of my bedroom black and covered the windows with fiberglass insulation."

Disappointed by Pinkerton's reception, Cuomo intended to return to simpler songwriting with less personal lyrics. He stated that Weezer's subsequent albums, the Green Album (2001) and Maladroit (2002), were "very intentionally not about me. Not about what was going on in my life, at least in a conscious way." He also developed a greater appreciation for pop music, feeling that its multiple disciplines — including lyrics, improvisation, and image — produce a multifaceted art "that moves people and is important, and relevant to our culture in a way that serious classical music isn't right now". In June 2006, he graduated cum laude with a Bachelor of Arts in English from Harvard and was elected to Phi Beta Kappa.

On December 6, 2009, Cuomo was in his tour bus driving to Boston from Toronto with his family and assistant when the bus hit an icy road in Glen, New York and crashed. He suffered cracked ribs and internal bleeding. Weezer canceled the rest of the 2009 tour dates, planning to reschedule them the following year. They made their return to the stage on January 20, 2010, performing at Florida State University in Tallahassee, Florida.

Other projects

During Weezer's hiatus after the release of Pinkerton, Cuomo formed Homie, and performed what he called "goofball songs" for his "country band". An album was planned, but only one studio recording, a song titled "American Girls", was released. Cuomo has contributed to recordings by various other musicians (Crazy Town, Cold, Mark Ronson). Cuomo managed the band AM Radio in 2002 and 2003; he and the band's frontman, Kevin Ridel, went to school together.

In early 2004, Cuomo joined ex-Weezer bassist Matt Sharp onstage at California State University, Fullerton. They worked on a record together in February that year, but the material remains unreleased. In March 2008, Cuomo began a YouTube video series in which he wrote a song in collaboration with YouTube viewers. The finished song, "Turning Up the Radio", was released in 2010 on the Weezer compilation album Death to False Metal.

In December 2007, Cuomo released Alone: The Home Recordings of Rivers Cuomo, a compilation of his demos recorded from 1992 to 2007. It was followed by Alone II: The Home Recordings of Rivers Cuomo in November 2008 and Alone III: The Pinkerton Years in November 2010; the latter album was sold exclusively with a book, The Pinkerton Diaries, which collects Cuomo's writings from the preceding the release of Pinkerton.

Cuomo has made cameos in a number of music videos, including The Crystal Method's "Murder" and the video for The Warlocks' "Cocaine Blues." Cuomo also makes a guest appearance on Sugar Ray's "Boardwalk", the first single on the group's latest album, Music for Cougars. Cuomo featured on the song "Magic", on B.o.B's debut album B.o.B Presents: The Adventures of Bobby Ray which was released in April 2010. In a May interview with HitQuarters, producer-songwriter Lucas Secon confirmed that he had recently worked with Cuomo on both a Steve Aoki single and "some Weezer stuff."

In 2011, Cuomo collaborated with Japanese singer Hitomi for her first independent album Spirit, in the duet "Rollin' with da Homies", co-written by him. He was also featured on the Simple Plan song "Can't Keep My Hands Off You" and Miranda Cosgrove's song, "High Maintenance". In 2013, Cuomo released a self-titled Japanese-language album with Scott Murphy under the name Scott & Rivers. The album debuted at #1 on the iTunes Japan alternative charts. The album was released physically in Japan and digitally worldwide through iTunes. In 2015, Cuomo appeared on the song "Snowed In" on Big Data's album 2.0. In the same year, Cuomo produced a Fox pilot for a sitcom based on his life, DeTour, starring Ben Aldridge as Cuomo. The pilot was not picked up.

In 2017, Cuomo featured in RAC's "I Still Wanna Know", as well as Vic Mensa's "Homewrecker", which sampled Weezer's "The Good Life". The same year, he co-wrote and appeared on AJR's "Sober Up". "Sober Up" reached number one on the Billboard Alternative Charts, becoming Cuomo's first song as a solo artist to reach number one on Billboard's Alternative chart outside of Weezer. Cuomo also co-wrote the song "Why Won't You Love Me" on 5 Seconds of Summer's 2018 album Youngblood. In 2018, he helped write two songs, "Clock Work" and "Dancing Girl" for Asian Kung-Fu Generation's 2018 album, Hometown. Cuomo also performed a live cover of Toto's "Africa" during the homecoming halftime show at Santa Monica College. In 2019, he wrote and performed "Backflip," the theme song for the Netflix series Green Eggs and Ham. In 2020, Cuomo released more than two thousand demos and home recordings on his website.

In 2022, Cuomo released the Indonesian-language song "Anak Sekolah", originally by Indonesian singer Chrisye, before Weezer performed it in Indonesia.

Artistry 

Appearing on the Song Exploder podcast in 2016, Cuomo explained the process he used to write albums such as Weezer's White Album (2016). He maintains Spotify playlists of music with "cool" chord progressions that he uses for inspiration. He sometimes uses piano to write vocal melodies his vocal muscles would be "too lazy" to create. Conversely, he improvises vocal melodies to write guitar solos, to avoid guitar habits and create solos "you can sing along to" with "space in [them] because I have to breathe". He has a tenor vocal range.

Cuomo's process of writing lyrics involves writing stream-of-consciousness thoughts in his journal, highlighting interesting lines, and adding them to a spreadsheet organized by the number of syllables they contain and strong-weak emphasis. When he comes to write a song, he finds lines that fit the melody and assembles them in a way that suggests a story. He rarely uses profanity in his lyrics, as "Weezer came up at a time when Jane's Addiction released Nothing's Shocking — everyone was trying to be controversial. We looked back to rock and roll's pre-drug days — to the clean images of the Beach Boys — that felt, ironically, rebellious." He has experimented with various methods of "concentration", such as fasting, to aid his songwriting.

Influences 
Cuomo credited the Beach Boys as a major influence on his early songwriting. He told Upset:

On tour with Weezer following the Blue Album, Cuomo listened extensively to the operas Aida (1871) and Madama Butterfly (1904), the rock opera Jesus Christ Superstar (1970), and the musical Les Misérables (1980), which influenced the composition of Pinkerton and the unreleased Songs from the Black Hole.

Cuomo's other influences include the Beatles, Kiss, Nirvana, Giacomo Puccini, Green Day, Jane's Addiction, Iron Maiden, Slayer, Judas Priest, Cat Stevens, Lou Barlow, the Who, Pixies, Stevie Ray Vaughan, Elliot Smith, Mike Smith, and Sonic Youth, many of these being referenced in Weezer's 2008 song "Heart Songs". In the late 90s, Cuomo created an "Encyclopedia of Pop" for himself, a three-ring binder in which he examined pop and rock songs by artists including Nirvana, Green Day, and Oasis.

Equipment

Cuomo recorded the Blue Album with a Gibson Les Paul Special and a Fender Jaguar borrowed from producer Ric Ocasek. His amp was a vintage Mesa Boogie Mark I. For touring, he initially used a sonic blue Warmoth Fender Stratocaster copy with Seymour Duncan and DiMarzio pickups alongside Marshall amps. However, the guitar was destroyed in late 1997. In recent years, he has used additional Warmoth Strat copies (in blue, seafoam green, black and blonde), as well as a Gibson SG painted in white with a Seymour Duncan bridge pickup. During the Hella Mega Tour in 2021, Cuomo has been seen playing a Jackson Rhoads, which seems a tip of the hat to Randy Rhoads, likely having a connection to the recent use of Rhoads' solo on "Crazy Train". The guitars are plugged into a Kemper Profiler amp.

Personal life
Cuomo took a vow of sexual abstinence from 2004 until his marriage in 2006. On June 18, 2006, Cuomo married Kyoko Ito, whom he met in March 1997 at one of his solo concerts at the Middle East club in Cambridge, Massachusetts. He proposed to her in Tokyo shortly before Christmas 2005. The wedding was held at a beach on Paradise Cove in Malibu and was attended by all past and present members of Weezer (except for Mikey Welsh), as well as Kevin Ridel and Rick Rubin. The couple have two children: daughter Mia, born in 2007, and son Leo, born in 2011.

Cuomo was born with equal length legs, but as he grew to his full height, his left leg grew nearly two inches shorter than his right. After the success of The Blue Album, Cuomo underwent the Ilizarov procedure to correct the condition. This involved the surgical breaking of the bone in his leg, followed by several months of wearing a steel brace that required self-administered "stretching" of the leg four times daily; Cuomo likened the ordeal to "crucifying [his] leg."

Cuomo has been vegetarian since childhood. However, in 2002, he told an interviewer that he might like to start eating meat regularly and stated he had done so in the past, eating "some kind of barbecued beef in Tokyo."

Cuomo practices Vipassanā meditation and was a student of S. N. Goenka. As of mid-2009, he also teaches children's meditation as taught by S. N. Goenka. Cuomo helped acquire music rights and provided financial support to a 2007 documentary titled The Dhamma Brothers about Vipassanā meditation being instituted in an Alabama state prison.

Cuomo was a fan of soccer at an early age. He wrote a song, "My Day Is Coming", in tribute to the U.S. men's soccer team in 2006, and in 2010, wrote "Represent", an "unofficial anthem" for the U.S. team, which was released as a Weezer single on June 11, the day before Team USA's World Cup opener against England. In early 2008, Cuomo played in the Mia and Nomar Celebrity Soccer Challenge and scored a goal in the game. The video for "Lover in the Snow", from the Alone album, deals with this game and his love of soccer growing up. In August 2009, Cuomo participated in the Athletes for Africa 5v5 Charity Soccer Tournament in Toronto, Canada alongside actor Michael Cera.

Cuomo performed at a campaign rally for Democratic presidential candidate Andrew Yang in Iowa on November 1, 2019, though Cuomo did not explicitly endorse Yang.

Cuomo's hobbies include computer programming. He took the CS50 course and maintains a GitHub profile, and also maintains a Discord server.

Discography 

With Weezer

 Weezer (Blue Album) (1994)
 Pinkerton (1996)
 Weezer (Green Album) (2001)
 Maladroit (2002)
 Make Believe (2005)
 Weezer (Red Album) (2008)
 Raditude (2009)
 Hurley (2010)
Death to False Metal (2010)
 Everything Will Be Alright in the End (2014)
 Weezer (White Album) (2016)
 Pacific Daydream (2017)
 Weezer (Teal Album) (2019)
 Weezer (Black Album) (2019)
 OK Human (2021)
 Van Weezer (2021)
 SZNZ: Spring (2022)
 SZNZ: Summer (2022)
 SZNZ: Autumn (2022)
 SZNZ: Winter (2022)
With Scott and Rivers
 スコット と リバース ("Scott & Rivers") (2013)
 ニマイメ ("The Second One") (2017)

Homie 
 Meet The Deedles soundtrack on the song American Girls (1998)
Solo 
 Alone: The Home Recordings of Rivers Cuomo (2007)
 Alone II: The Home Recordings of Rivers Cuomo (2008)
 Not Alone – Rivers Cuomo and Friends: Live at Fingerprints (2009)
 Alone III: The Pinkerton Years (2011)
Singles
 Medicine For Melancholy (2018)
 Anak Sekolah (2022)
Weezify demo bundles

 Alone IV: Before Weezer (2020)
 Alone V: The Blue-Pinkerton Years (2020)
 Alone VI: The Black Room (2020)
 Alone VII: The Green Years (2020)
 Alone VIII: The Maladroit Years (2020)
 Alone IX: The Make Believe Years (2020)
 Alone X: The Red-Raditude-Hurley Years (2020)
 Alone XI: The EWBAITE Years (2020)
 Alone XII: The White Year (2020)
 Alone XIII: The Pacific Daydream Years (2021)

References

External links

 Interview with The Harvard Crimson about his Harvard years
 
 
 
 Rivers Cuomo Archived MySpace Postings
 Rivers Cuomo on his creative career
 Biographical article in Shambhala Sun Magazine
 Scott & Rivers on Facebook

1970 births
20th-century American singers
21st-century American singers
American male singer-songwriters
American people of English descent
American people of German descent
American people of Italian descent
American rock guitarists
American male guitarists
Alternative rock guitarists
American rock singers
American rock songwriters
Berklee College of Music alumni
Grammy Award winners
Harvard College alumni
Living people
Singers from Los Angeles
Weezer members
Musicians Institute alumni
Power pop musicians
Guitarists from Los Angeles
Guitarists from Connecticut
Singer-songwriters from California
Singer-songwriters from Connecticut